The 1859 Louisiana gubernatorial election was the third election to take place under the Louisiana Constitution of 1852. As a result of this election Thomas Overton Moore became Governor of Louisiana. This was the last Louisiana gubernatorial election before the outbreak of the Civil War.

Results
Popular Vote

References

1859
Gubernatorial
Louisiana
November 1859 events